Bupyeong-gu Office Station is a subway station on Line 1 of the Incheon Subway. In May 2021, it was connected to the Seoul Subway Line 7 was is terminal station until the next extension completed in 22 May 2021.

Station layout

Incheon Metro Line 1

Seoul Subway Line 7

Vicinity
Exit 1 : Galsan middle school, Eorinyi park, Galsan elementary school, Bupyeong technical high school, Galwol elementary school
Exit 2 : Geunlin park, Bupyeong-gu office, Gaeheung elementary school
Exit 3 :
Exit 4 :
Exit 5 :
Exit 6 :
Exit 7 :
Exit 8 : Bupyeong police office, Bupyeong Selim Hospital, Majang elementary school, Daewoo Motors South gate
Exit 9 : Daewoo Motors main gate

References

Metro stations in Incheon
Bupyeong District
Seoul Metropolitan Subway stations
Railway stations in South Korea opened in 1999